Ogasawarana is a genus of land snails with an operculum, terrestrial gastropod mollusk in the family Helicinidae, the helicinids.

Species
Species within the genus Ogasawarana include:
 Ogasawarana arata
 Ogasawarana capsula
 Ogasawarana chichijimana (Kuroda, 1956)
 Ogasawarana comes
 Ogasawarana discrepans
 Ogasawarana habei
 Ogasawarana hirasei
 Ogasawarana metamorpha (Kuroda, 1956)
 Ogasawarana microtheca
 Ogasawarana nitida
 Ogasawarana obtusa†
 Ogasawarana ogasawarana (Pilsbry, 1902)
 Ogasawarana optima
 Ogasawarana rex (A.J. Wagner, 1909)
 Ogasawarana yoshiwarana

References 

Helicinidae
Taxonomy articles created by Polbot